Cebiv is a municipality and village in Tachov District in the Plzeň Region of the Czech Republic. It has about 300 inhabitants.

Administrative parts
The village of Bezemín is an administrative part of Cebiv.

Gallery

References

Villages in Tachov District